Petros Ravousis (born 1 October 1954) is a Greek former professional footballer who played as defender and a former manager.

Club career
Ravousis took his first football steps in Aetos Skydra from where he was transferred to AEK Athens in the summer of 1972. A dynamic and tough defender, who was developed by the then coach František Fadrhonc. The Czech coach, by moving Lakis Nikolaou from the attack to the center of defense and pairing him with Ravousis, created one of the best defensive duos in Greek football history, as the one complemented the other's capabilities. Ravousis, being dynamic and agile, also contributed to the team's scoring, usually in set-pieces in the opponent's area. He was a key player in AEK's course to the semi-finals of the UEFA Cup in the 1977. In the 12 years he played at AEK, he won 2 Championships and 2 Greek Cups including a domestic double in 1978. In the summer of 1984, and after he had first taken care to prepare his successor as the leader of the "yellow-black" defense, Stelios Manolas, Ravousis left AEK and wore the shirt of Levadiakos. After two seasons at the club of Livadeia, in the summer of 1986 he retired from as a footballer at the age of 32.

International career
Ravousis played with Greece in 22 matches, in the period between 1976 and 1981. He made his debut on 10 November 1976 under Lakis Petropoulos in a friendly match against Austria, held in Kavala. He was a member of the team in the final phase of UEFA Euro 1980 in Italy, where competed against Germany

Managerial career
Ravousis started his managerial career in 1988, at the side of Dušan Bajević as an assistant coach, in a period where AEK played amazing football and won 4 championships and 1 cup. With Bajević leaving for Olympiakos in the summer of 1996, AEK owner Michalis Trochanas appointed Ravousis as Bajević's successor. AEK played excellent football and won the cup and the super cup, reaches the quarter-finals of the UEFA Cup Winners' Cup, while in the league they finished in the 2nd place. That season Ravousis defeated his "teacher" Bajević in 3 of the 4 matches they faced each other. Trochanas created problems for Ravousis made him leave after the end of the season. After AEK Ravousis sat on the bench of various smaller teams such as Paniliakos, Panetolikos, Veria, AEK Larnaca, Akratitos and Marko until 2005, where he stayed away from the football benches.

Honours

As a player

AEK Athens
Alpha Ethniki: 1977–78, 1978–79
Greek Cup: 1977–78, 1982–83

As a coach

AEK Athens
Greek Cup: 1996–97
Greek Super Cup: 1996

References

External links

1954 births
Living people
Greek footballers
Greece international footballers
Association football defenders
AEK Athens F.C. players
AEK Athens F.C. managers
Levadiakos F.C. players
UEFA Euro 1980 players
Greek football managers
Greek expatriate football managers
Super League Greece players
Veria F.C. managers
AEK Larnaca FC managers
People from Skydra
Footballers from Central Macedonia